Thibaut Visensang (born 8 January 1991) is a French-born Spanish professional rugby union player. He plays at flanker for Bayonne in the Top 14.

References

External links
Ligue Nationale De Rugby Profile
European Professional Club Rugby Profile
Bayonne Profile

Living people
1991 births
French people of Spanish descent
French rugby union players
Spanish rugby union players
Rugby union flankers
Aviron Bayonnais players
Spain international rugby union players